is a Japanese actress and singer. She is represented with Production Ogi. Seiko is best known for her Musical theatre lead roles in Japan in Les Misérables, Miss Saigon, and Marie Antoinette.

On Television Seiko is well known for being the 5 time consecutive champion in the reality TV karaoke competition "Kanjani∞ no The Mozart Ongakuou No.1 Ketteisen" 

Seiko has won numerous awards, such as the Kazuo Kikuta Theatre Award in 2005, the National Arts Festival Theatre Department Newcomer Award in 2006, and in 2016, the Tokiko Iwatani Award. Seiko has also performed with West end and Broadway superstars, Norm Lewis, Peter Jöback, Ramin Karimloo, and Sierra Boggess in I Love Musicals. (2016) Additionally, along with numerous roles on the stage and performances, Seiko had many roles in major television series and dramas as well as roles in films and even Anime. Seiko has released five albums, most recently Colors of Life in 2019.  She was also ranked as the #5 top vocalists in Japan, by a panel of 190 music industry professionals.  2021, April 4 TBS TV program "Hontonotoko Oshiete Ranking".

Awards 
2005: 31st Kazuo Kikuta Theatre Award (21C: Mademoiselle Mozart as Mozart/Madame de Sade as Rene)
2006: 61st National Arts Festival Theatre Department Newcomer Award (Marie Antoinette as Marguerite Arnaud)
2016: 7th Tokiko Iwatani Award

Filmography

TV series

TV drama

Radio

Stage

Films

Japanese dub

Anime

Advertisements

Discography

Singles

Albums

Participation

Tie-ups

References

External links
 
  
 
 Seiko Niizuma at Yomiuri Online

Japanese voice actresses
1980 births
Living people
Actors from Aichi Prefecture
People from Inazawa
Sophia University alumni
Fantasy on Ice guest artists
21st-century Japanese actresses
21st-century Japanese singers
21st-century Japanese women singers